The Pickwick Club is a private gentlemen's club in New Orleans, Louisiana.  Founded in 1857, The Pickwick Club and the Mistick Krewe were originally one group comprising two organizations. After The Boston Club, The Pickwick Club is the second oldest remaining in the city.

History
On February 8, 1857, a group of men, some former Orleans Club members, who resided in the Anglo-American neighborhoods of New Orleans, met in the Club Room of the Gem Saloon-a former residence of William Parker of Natchez, located at Old No 17 Royal Street (127 Royal Street). The idea was initially conceived at Pope's pharmacy on the corner of Jackson and Prytania. Six gentlemen (most originally from Mobile, Alabama) sent out an invitation to a select group of friends to meet at the Gem Saloon, where the first carnival organization the Miskick Krewe was organized, and in June following within its ranks The Pickwick Club for the purpose of covering the mysteries and membership of the Mistick Krewe.

The history of social clubs in New Orleans began with The Elkin Club, founded 1832 and folded in 1838. It was an "open club" that sponsored dances and balls in the vicinity of Bayou St John and closed due to the financial crisis of 1837. The Pelican Club, founded 1843 and folded at the beginning of the Civil War, confined its membership through blackball policies to bankers, cotton brokers, attorneys, physicians, and political leaders. The smallest lapse in credit spelled denial of membership. Younger gentlemen, who had been rejected membership to the Pelican Club, organized The Orleans Club in 1851 with similar, yet less restrictive, membership policies; but similarly shuttered its doors, never to reopen, at the outset of the Civil War. It would be the ex-members of The Orleans Club, who would have themselves organized a carnival celebration, that would go on to form The Pickwick Club.

The Pickwick, unlike the Boston Club, began as a "closed club," but evidence suggests before the turn of the 19th century the club allowed members to extend the club's hospitality to out of town guests during Carnival.

Notable members
Adley H. Gladden, First President, was lieutenant colonel and second commander of the Palmetto Regiment of South Carolina volunteers during the Mexican–American War and a brigadier general in the Confederate States Army during the American Civil War.
Albert Walter Merriam was a lieutenant colonel in the Louisiana Confederate Military. He built and owned the Crescent Hall.
William J. Behan, was an American Confederate veteran and politician. He served as the 41st mayor of New Orleans (November 20, 1882 – April 28, 1884).
Edward Douglass White, American politician and jurist, was a United States Senator and the ninth Chief Justice of the United States. He served on the Supreme Court of the United States from 1894 to 1921. He is best known for formulating the Rule of reason standard of antitrust law.
Harry T. Hays was an American Army officer serving in the Mexican–American War and a general who served in the Confederate Army during the American Civil War.
Paul Capdevielle was mayor of New Orleans, Louisiana, from May 9, 1900, to December 5, 1904.
Charles de Choiseul, Confederate States Army officer during the American Civil War serving under Harry T. Hays; son of French Nobleman Charles de Choiseul-Praslin.
Dr. Robert Tayloe Cook V, MD, FFV, of the Tayloe's of Mount Airy, VA and The Octagon, D.C. His great uncle, H. Tayloe, founded the Fair Grounds in 1838 with Mandeville de Marigny. Doctor of radiology at Baptist Hospital and past president of the Louisiana SNMMI.

Homes of The Pickwick Club
Tchoupitoulas Street just above Poydras Street 1857 – January 1858
No. 57 St. Charles Street, just beyond Gravier Street 1858–1865
The corner of Canal and Exchange Alley Streets 1865–1881
148 Canal Street (Today, 824 Canal Street-The Boston Club)1881–1882
The corner of Canal and Carondelet Streets 1882–1894 "Pickwick Palace"
No.4 Carondelet Street 1894–1899 (Forstall Mansion)
1030 Canal Street 1899–1934
Unknown 1934–1950
The Crescent City Billiard Hall, corner of Canal St and St Charles Ave, 1950–present

Gallery

See also
The Boston Club
List of gentlemen's clubs in the United States
Mistick Krewe

References

New Orleans